Rudolph Novak (January 29, 1887 in Chroustovice – October 16, 1968 in Cedar Rapids, Iowa) was an American gymnast who competed in the 1924 Summer Olympics.

References

1887 births
1968 deaths
People from Chrudim District
American male artistic gymnasts
Olympic gymnasts of the United States
Gymnasts at the 1924 Summer Olympics
Austro-Hungarian emigrants to the United States
American people of Czech descent